Hannah Martin  (born 30 December 1994) is an English field hockey player who plays as a midfielder or forward for Surbiton and the England and Great Britain national teams.

She was educated at Ipswich School. Her brother is Harry Martin who plays for the England and Great Britain national teams.

Club career

Martin will play club hockey in the 2021-22 season, in the Dutch Hoofdklasse for Hurley.

She has been playing in the Women's England Hockey League Premier Division for Surbiton.
She has also played for University of Birmingham and Ipswich.

International career
Martin made her senior International debut against South Africa in February 2017.
She has also played for England U-16 (2009–10), U-18 (2011–12) and U-21 (from 2012-2016).

References

External links
 
 Hannah Martin at Great Britain Hockey
 Hannah Martin at England Hockey
 
 
 
 

1994 births
Living people
English female field hockey players
English Olympic medallists
Female field hockey forwards
Female field hockey midfielders
Olympic field hockey players of Great Britain
Olympic bronze medallists for Great Britain
Olympic medalists in field hockey
Field hockey players at the 2020 Summer Olympics
Medalists at the 2020 Summer Olympics
Commonwealth Games medallists in field hockey
Commonwealth Games bronze medallists for England
Field hockey players at the 2018 Commonwealth Games
Sportspeople from Ipswich
Surbiton Hockey Club players
Women's England Hockey League players
University of Birmingham Hockey Club players
Medallists at the 2018 Commonwealth Games